The Beersheba bus bombings were two suicide bombings carried out nearly simultaneously aboard commuter buses in Beersheba, Israel, on August 31, 2004. 16 people were killed and more than 100 were injured. Hamas claimed responsibility for the attacks.

Background 

The previous major attack on Be'er sheva was the 19 October 1998 grenade attack on the Central bus station, where 64 people were wounded when a Palestinian from Hebron threw two grenades at the bus station.

During the Second Intifada in the early 2000s (decade), at the time which was characterized by an intensified period of suicide attacks were carried out in Israel by the Palestinian militant organizations in Israel, Be'er Sheva was considered a relatively safe place, as it did not experience any terror attacks.

In 2004, the year in which the attack was carried out, the second intifada was declining, and then the tensions escalated in March 2004, with the assassination of the leader of Hamas Ahmed Yassin. A month later, in April, Yassin's successor Abdel Aziz al-Rantissi was assassinated. After those two assassinations Israel had the quietest four months since the outbreak of the Second Intifada, which came to an end when the Beersheba bus bombings were carried out.

The attacks
At time of the attacks, the "Metrodan Beersheba" public buses (lines 6 and 12) were packed with Israeli civilians and were traveling along the main street of Beersheba, Rager Boulevard, near the City hall, at a very crowded place. At 14:50 pm, the first bomber blew up the explosive device hidden underneath his clothes on bus No. 6 as the bus passed a busy intersection in the center of town. Two minutes later, the second bomber blew himself up while on board bus No. 12 which was located about 100 meters away from the first bus. The force of the explosion, which blew away and mutilated the limbs of many civilians, made it difficult for the authorities to identify the victims. The youngest victim was a 3½ year old boy killed while sitting on his mother's lap.

The perpetrators 
After the attacks the Izz ad-Din al-Qassam Brigades, the military wing of Hamas, claimed responsibility for the attacks. A video tape released after the attack by Hamas showed the two suicide bombers, Nassem Jabari (22) and Ahmad Qawasameh (26), posing with rifles and posters. Hamas distributed leaflets in Hebron which stated that the attack was in revenge for the assassination of Hamas leaders Ahmed Yassin and Abdel Aziz al-Rantissi by Israel. The Israeli government accused Syria and "terror command posts in Damascus" of involvement in the attack.

Reactions
Following the bombing, an estimated 20,000 Hamas supporters in Gaza took to the streets to celebrate.

The Israeli Foreign Minister Silvan Shalom placed the blame on Yasser Arafat for not preventing the attacks, and for bringing nothing but "terror and evil" since his return to the Palestinian territories.

Aftermath
The lethal attack was a shock to the Israeli public, especially due to the fact that the two Palestinian suicide bombers managed to get from Hebron to Beersheba after simply walking across the Green Line demarcation lines without difficulty. For this reason, after the attack many Israeli public officials, including Police Commissioner Moshe Karadi made emphasized that a hermetic separation barrier between Israel and the West Bank was vital to Israel's security. The southern part of the Israeli West Bank barrier was completed only after the attack.

On September 26, 2004, Izz El-Deen Sheikh Khalil, a senior member of Hamas' military wing, was killed in a car bombing in the al-Zahera district of southern Damascus, Syria. The killing was blamed on Israeli agents. Officially, the Israeli government refused to claim responsibility, but unnamed Israeli sources unofficially acknowledged that Israel had assassinated Khalil as a response to the Beersheba bus bombings.

See also
Beersheva bus station shooting

References

External links
 Twin Blasts Kill 16 in Israel; Hamas Claims Responsibility – published on The New York Times on September 1, 2004
 16 killed in suicide bombings on buses in Israel – published on CNN on September 1, 2004
 Suicide terrorists blow up buses in southern Israel – published on USA Today on August 31, 2004
 16 die in Be'er Sheva bombings – published on Haaretz on September 1, 2004
 Be'er Sheva bus bombers were part of Hamas cell in Hebron – published on Haaretz on September 1, 2004
 Double bombing of buses in Beersheba – published on August 31, 2004 on the Israeli Ministry of Foreign Affairs website

Mass murder in 2004
Suicide bombings in 2004
Hamas suicide bombings of buses
Israeli casualties in the Second Intifada
Terrorist incidents in Israel in 2004
August 2004 events in Asia
Islamic terrorism in Israel